Xylophanes schausi is a moth of the family Sphingidae first described by Walter Rothschild in 1894.

Distribution 
It is known from Venezuela, Brazil and Bolivia.

Description 
The distal margin of the forewing is strongly convex. The abdomen has no dorsal lines. The postmedian lines are dentate and the two proximal lines are faint, but traceable from the costal to the inner margin. The third is barely indicated and the fourth is marked only by dots on the veins. The pale median band is pale olive brown.

Biology 
Adults are probably on wing year round.

The larvae probably feed on Rubiaceae and Malvaceae species.

Subspecies
Xylophanes schausi schausi (Brazil and Bolivia)
Xylophanes schausi serenus Rothschild & Jordan, 1910 (Venezuela)

References

schausi
Moths described in 1894